Comanche County is a county located on the Edwards Plateau in Central Texas. As of the 2020 census, its population was 13,594. The county seat is Comanche. The county was founded in 1856 and is named for the Comanche Native American tribe.

History
Among the first inhabitants of present-day Comanche County were the Comanche Indian tribe.

In 1854, Jesse M. Mercer and others organized a colony near the future settlement of Newburg. in Comanche County on lands earlier granted by Mexico to Stephen F. Austin and Samuel May Williams.  Frank M. Collier built the first log house in the county.

In 1856, the Texas legislature formed Comanche County from Coryell and Bosque counties. Cora community, named after Cora Beeman of Bell County, was designated as the county seat. Comanche became the county seat in 1859. As of 1860, the county population was 709 persons, including 61 slaves.

The Comanche Chief began publication in 1873. Editor Joe Hill's brother, Robert T. Hill, worked on the newspaper while developing his esteemed career as a geologist.

In 1874, John Wesley Hardin and his gang celebrated his 21st birthday in Brown and Comanche counties. Deputy Charles Webb drew his gun, provoking a gunfight that ended Webb's life. A lynch mob was formed, but Hardin and his family were put into protective custody. The mob broke into the jail and hanged his brother Joe and two cousins. Hardin fled. He was arrested in 1877 by Texas Rangers and a local authority on a train in Pensacola, Florida, while traveling under the alias James W. Swain. He was tried in Comanche for the murder of Deputy Sheriff Charles Webb, and sentenced to 25 years in Huntsville Prison.

Known for its fertile soil, Comanche County was a hotbed of political populism in the latter years of the 19th century.

Expulsion of the African Americans
In 1886, "one of those too horribly frequent crimes was committed by an African American. He was quickly caught and was punished in accordance with the rules of the unwritten law." Following this lynching, at a meeting of the white citizens "it was resolved to give every african American in the county one week's notice to leave the county, and committees of men from different sections of the county were appointed to carry out the will of the white people."

Comanche County was a sundown town, the only such county in the U.S. to formally take this action. According to a 1953 study, the county took pride in and publicized its all-white population.

Black porters on the train would hide in the baggage car as trains passed through Comanche County. Because of the threats to its porters, the railroad asked that the sign be removed, and the town of De Leon moved it to the town well, "in the middle of Texas Avenue". No report gives the date of the sign's removal.

Arrival of the railroad
The Texas Central Railroad began service in Comanche County in 1885 and began carrying cattle and cotton to market. By 1890, cotton had become king in the county, but by the start of the 20th century, the boll weevil had devastated the county cotton industry for three decades. In 1907, farmers in the county began to experiment with peanut farming.

Oil was discovered at Desdemona in 1910. The peak year for the Comanche County oil boom was 1920.

In 1951–1952, a desperate, drought-stricken county experimented with rain making. Proctor Lake was impounded in 1963 to provide flood control and drinking water.

From 1968 to 1974, Comanche County native Jim Reese served as the mayor of Odessa, Texas. He launched unsuccessful congressional campaigns in the 1976 general election against the Democrat George H. Mahon and in the 1978 Republican primary against George W. Bush. During the 1970s, the oil industrialist Bill Noël of Odessa purchased orchards in Comanche County.

Geography
The county is located some 60 miles north of the geographic center of Texas.

The county is home to Proctor Lake.

Adjacent counties
 Erath County (northeast)
 Hamilton County (southeast)
 Mills County (south)
 Brown County (southwest)
 Eastland County (northwest)

Demographics

Note: the US Census treats Hispanic/Latino as an ethnic category. This table excludes Latinos from the racial categories and assigns them to a separate category. Hispanics/Latinos can be of any race.

As of the census of 2000,  14,026 people, 5,522 households, and 3,926 families were residing in the county.  The population density was 15 people per square mile (6/km2).  The 7,105 housing units had an average density of 8 per square mile (3/km2).  The racial makeup of the county was 87.30% White, 0.44% African American, 0.61% Native American, 0.13% Asian, 9.71% from other races, and 1.82% from two or more races.  About 21%  of the population were Hispanics or Latinos of any race.

Of the 5,522 households, 29.8% had children under 18 living with them, 59.2% were married couples living together, 8.1% had a female householder with no husband present, and 28.9% were not families. About 26% of all households were made up of individuals, and 15.2% had someone living alone who was 65 or older.  The average household size was 2.48, and the average family size was 2.98.

In the county, the age distribution was 25.3% under 18, 7.1% from 18 to 24, 23.3% from 25 to 44, 24.0% from 45 to 64, and 20.3% who were 65 or older.  The median age was 40 years. For every 100 females, there were 95.8 males.  For every 100 females 18 and over, there were 94.4 males.

The median income for a household in the county was $28,422, and for a family was $34,810. Males had a median income of $26,094 versus $18,912 for females. The per capita income for the county was $14,677.  About 14% of families and 17.30% of the population were below the poverty line, including 22.6% of those under 18 and 16.0% of those 65 or over.

Transportation

Major highways
   U.S. Highway 67/U.S. Highway 377
  State Highway 16
  State Highway 36

Airport
The Comanche County-City Airport is located 2.0 nautical miles (2.3 mi, 3.7 km) northeast of the City of Comanche's central business district.

Media
Comanche County is currently listed as part of the Dallas-Fort Worth DMA. Local media outlets include KDFW-TV, KXAS-TV, WFAA-TV, KTVT-TV, KERA-TV, KTXA-TV, KDFI-TV, KDAF-TV, and KFWD-TV. Other nearby stations that provide coverage for Comanche County include KCEN-TV, KWTX-TV, and KAKW-DT from the Waco/Temple/Killeen DMA, and KTXS-TV, KTAB-TV, and KRBC-TV from the Abilene/Sweetwater/Brownwood DMA.

Two local newspapers serve Comanche County: the Comanche Chief and the De Leon Free Press.

Communities

Cities
 Comanche (county seat)
 De Leon

Town
 Gustine

Census-designated places
 Lamkin
 Proctor

Other unincorporated communities

 Amity
 Beattie
 Comyn
 Downing
 Duster
 Energy
 Hasse
 Hazel Dell
 Newburg
 Rucker
 Sidney
 Sipe Springs
 Vandyke
 Wilson

Ghost towns
 Cora
 Democrat
 Mercer's Gap
 Suez
 Watson

Politics

See also

 National Register of Historic Places listings in Comanche County, Texas
 Recorded Texas Historic Landmarks in Comanche County

References

Further reading

External links
 
 Comanche County Telephone [Comanche County Telephone]
 The Comanche Chief Newspaper
 The De Leon Free-Press Newspaper

 
1856 establishments in Texas
Populated places established in 1856
Sundown towns in Texas
Anti-black racism in the United States